The 1994 PBA All-Star Game is the annual all-star weekend of the Philippine Basketball Association (PBA). The events were held on June 12, 1994, at Cuneta Astrodome in Pasay.

All-Star Game

Rosters

North All-Stars:
Johnny Abarrientos (Alaska)
Ato Agustin (San Miguel)
Sonny Cabatu (Tondeña)
Allan Caidic (San Miguel)
Jerry Codiñera (Coney Island)
Gerry Esplana (Sta. Lucia)
Jayvee Gayoso (Tondeña)
Bong Hawkins (Alaska)
Ronnie Magsanoc (Shell)
Vergel Meneses (Swift)
Victor Pablo (Pepsi)
Benjie Paras (Shell)
Coach: Chot Reyes (Coney Island)

South All-Stars:
Boy Cabahug (Pepsi)
Romeo dela Rosa (Sta. Lucia)
Rey Evangelista (Coney Island)
Ramon Fernandez (San Miguel)
Abet Guidaben (Shell)
Jojo Lastimosa (Alaska)
Jun Limpot (Sta. Lucia)
Noli Locsin (Tondeña)
Franz Pumaren (San Miguel)
Dindo Pumaren (Pepsi)
Jack Tanuan (Swift)
Alvin Teng (San Miguel)
Coach: Tim Cone (Alaska)

Game

Skills Challenge Winners
Buzzer-Beater Contest: Ato Agustin (San Miguel) and Richie Ticzon (Coney Island) were declared co-winners.
Three-point Shootout: Ric-Ric Marata (Shell)
Slam Dunk Competition: Victor Pablo (Pepsi)

References

All-Star Game
Philippine Basketball Association All-Star Weekend